Mohiuddinnagar Station, station code MOG, is a railway station in the  division of East Central Railway. Shahpur Patori Station is located in Mohiuddinagar block in Samastipur district in the Indian state of Bihar.

Railway stations in Samastipur district